Augusto Graziani (4 May 1933 – 5 January 2014) was an Italian economist, Professor in Political Economy at University la Sapienza, most known for his contribution to  monetary economics in founding monetary circuit theory.

See also 
 Endogenous money

Further reading 
 Brief biography.
 Philip Arestis, Malcolm C. Sawyer, A biographical dictionary of dissenting economists, "Augusto GRAZIANI" (biography), pp. 254–263.
 Augusto Graziani, "The theory of the monetary circuit", Economies et Societes, vol. 24, n°. 6, pp. 7‐36 (1990).
 Augusto Graziani, "The theory of the monetary circuit", in The money supply in the economic process: a post Keynesian perspective, vol. 60, eds M. Musella and C. Panico, Elgar Reference Collection, International Library of Critical Writings in Economics, Aldershot, U.K. (1995)
 Augusto Graziani, "The Marxist Theory of Money". International Journal of Political Economy, vol. 27, n° 2, Marxian Theory: The Italian Debate (Summer, 1997), pp. 26–50.
 Augusto Graziani, The Monetary Theory of Production, Cambridge University Press, Cambridge, UK (2003).

References 

Monetary economists
Italian economists
Post-Keynesian economists
1933 births
2014 deaths